Ifeoma Mbanugo (born 3 March 1952) is a Nigerian long-distance runner. She competed in the women's marathon at the 1984 Summer Olympics.

References

1952 births
Living people
Athletes (track and field) at the 1984 Summer Olympics
Nigerian female long-distance runners
Nigerian female marathon runners
Olympic athletes of Nigeria
Place of birth missing (living people)
20th-century Nigerian women